Richard H. Riedel (April 5, 1904 – March 18, 1960) was an American art director. He was nominated for an Academy Award in the category Best Art Direction for the film Pillow Talk.

Selected filmography
 Riding for Germany (1941)
 Diesel (1942)
 The Noltenius Brothers (1945)
 Consul Strotthoff (1954)
 Before God and Man (1955)
 Pillow Talk (1959)

References

External links

1904 births
1960 deaths
American art directors